Qalujeh may refer to:
 Qalujeh, East Azerbaijan
 Qalujeh, Kurdistan